Halil Rud (also Romanized as Halīl Rūd; also known as Deh-e Halīl Rūd) is a village in Javaran Rural District, Hanza District, Rabor County, Kerman Province, Iran. At the 2006 census, its population was 238, in 50 families. It is located near Halil River.

Recent finds
A report from Iran states that this area "became famous between 2002/2003 [when news of] thousands of confiscated burial goods, especially elaborated carved chlorite vessels from the necropolises of Halil Rud" were released to public. For example, one grave contained "animal bones and food offerings, ceramics, and stone and copper items ... [indicating] a coherent cultural and chronological framework, around 2400-2200 BC"..  

Since February 2003, archaeologist have recovered a wealth of artifacts from the necropolis which they had named Mahtoutabad. The two nearby mounds, Konar Sandal South and North, were also excavated. A 2013 research paper about the South mound states that work during 2006 to 2009 "revealed the remains of three successive settlements dating to the fourth millennium BC".

Excavation re-commenced in 2014 and revealed art works of "complexity and beauty" and artifacts that proved that the society had several writing systems. According to National Geographic, the content of the mounds is significant:They turned out to contain the remains of two major architectural complexes. The northern mound included a cult building, while in the southern one were the remains of a fortified citadel. At the foot of the mounds, buried under many feet of sediment, were the remains of smaller buildings. It’s believed that the two mounds had once formed part of a unified urban settlement that stretched many miles across the plateau ... [artifacts] "have been dated to between 2500 and 2200 B.C. [They are said to be evidence of] the "development of a complex civilization".

References 

Populated places in Rabor County
Jiroft culture